Bruce Foye is an Australian former professional rugby league  footballer who played in the 1970s and 1980s for the North Sydney Bears and the Eastern Suburbs as a .

Playing career
Foye made his first grade debut for North Sydney in 1973.  In 1975, Foye got his chance to cement a place in the starting side after the retirement of Ross Warner.  Foye was a consistent starter for Norths over the next five seasons in a side which struggled on the field and culminated in a last placed finish in 1979.  In 1981, Foye joined Eastern Suburbs and played one season with club before retiring at the end of the year.

References

Living people
Australian rugby league players
North Sydney Bears players
Sydney Roosters players
Rugby league hookers
Place of birth missing (living people)
1951 births